is a Japanese professional motorcycle racer.

Motorcycle racing career
In 2010, he participated for the first time in a Moto2 World Championship event, as a wild-card rider in the Japanese Grand Prix but, was unable to start the race. Moriwaki's parents are Mamoru Moriwaki, the founder of Moriwaki Engineering and Namiko Yoshimura, the eldest daughter of famed motorcycle tuner Pops Yoshimura. Moriwaki is involved with his sister Midori in running Moriwaki Engineering.

Career statistics

Grand Prix motorcycle racing

By season

Races by year

References

External links

Living people
Japanese motorcycle racers
Moto2 World Championship riders
Year of birth missing (living people)